Grand Rapids Christian High School (GRCHS) is a private Christian secondary school in Grand Rapids, Michigan. Founded in 1920, "Christian High" is a member of Grand Rapids Christian Schools and Christian Schools International. The school was first accredited by the North Central Association of Colleges and Schools in 1925, one of the first six high schools in Kent County to receive that honor. GRCHS is also a member of the Michigan Association of Non-public Schools.

Notable alumni
Justin Amash, United States Representative of Michigan's 3rd congressional district
Richard DeVos, co-founder of Amway
Kavon Frazier, American NFL football player
Paul Schrader, director and screenwriter 
Xavier Tillman, NBA basketball player
Duane Washington Jr, NBA basketball player

References

External links

 Grand Rapids Christian High School

1920 establishments in Michigan
Christian schools in Michigan
Schools in Grand Rapids, Michigan
Private high schools in Michigan
Educational institutions established in 1920